Mokre may refer to:
Mokre, Grudziądz County in Kuyavian-Pomeranian Voivodeship (north-central Poland)
Mokre, Mogilno County in Kuyavian-Pomeranian Voivodeship (north-central Poland)
Mokre, Biała Podlaska County in Lublin Voivodeship (east Poland)
Mokre, Opole Voivodeship (south-west Poland)
Mokre-Kolonia in Opole Voivodeship, south Poland
Mokre, Podlaskie Voivodeship (north-east Poland)
Mokre, Łódź Voivodeship (central Poland)
Mokre, Zamość County in Lublin Voivodeship (east Poland)
Mokre, Dębica County in Subcarpathian Voivodeship (south-east Poland)
Mokre, Świętokrzyskie Voivodeship (south-central Poland)
Mokre, Sanok County in Subcarpathian Voivodeship (south-east Poland)
Mokre, Masovian Voivodeship (east-central Poland)
Mokre, Greater Poland Voivodeship (west-central Poland)
Mokre, Chojnice County in Pomeranian Voivodeship (north Poland)
Mokre, Słupsk County in Pomeranian Voivodeship (north Poland)
Mokre, Goleniów County in West Pomeranian Voivodeship (north-west Poland)
Mokre, Koszalin County in West Pomeranian Voivodeship (north-west Poland)
Mokre, Mikołów in Silesian Voivodeship (south Poland)